Jessy Moss is a singer/rapper. Her songs have appeared in a number of movies and television shows. She is best known for the hit Armand Van Helden remix of her song "Sugar".

Early life and career
Born in England, Moss was raised in Australia—staying with her father when her parents divorced and her mother moved to the United States. While visiting her mother in southern California, she caught the attention of a producer, who asked her to sing backup vocals for a project that he was working on. That led to an internship at Total Access Recording Studios in Redondo Beach, where she worked on records by artists including Long Beach Dub Allstars and Dio. In 2003 she released her debut solo album, Street Knuckles, on DreamWorks Records. She co-produced the record with Rick Hahn, Camara Kambon, and Butch Vig. That August, she was part of the Sprite Liquid Mix Tour with groups like N.E.R.D, The Roots, and Robert Randolph & the Family Band.

After DreamWorks shut down their record label, Moss self-released her second album, Fast and Cheap, in 2005. "Sugar", a song from that album, appeared on Armand Van Helden's 2005 Ultra Records mix CD, Nympho. Ultra released "Sugar" as a single in early 2006 (as Armand Van Helden featuring Jessy Moss) and managed to chart as high as No. 25 on the Billboard Hot Dance Singles Sales chart. Moss also released her third album, Down at the Disco, in 2006.

Personal life
In November 2008, she married drummer Steve Jocz of Sum 41. The couple have a son together, born April 2011.

Discography

Albums and EPs
Street Knuckles (2003, DreamWorks)
Fast and Cheap (2005, self-released)
Polyamorous EP (2005, self-released)
Down at the Disco (2006, self-released)

Singles
"Sugar" (2006, Ultra) (credited as "Armand Van Helden featuring Jessy Moss") (#25 Hot Dance Singles Sales)

Compilation appearances
Flo Mix (2003) (song: "Thanks for the Pictures")
Your Attention Please (2003) (song: "Confessions")
UnButtoned (2003) (song "Build You Up")
Lucky Sounds Volume Two (2003) (song: "Build You Up")
Nympho (mixed by Armand Van Helden) (2005, Ultra) (song: "Sugar")
Hope: Love Is the Answer (2006) (song: "Old Glory")
Sonicbids Presents The Real Deal (Listen Volume 2) (2006) (song: "Bitten Off")
Inkslingers Ball" (2006) (song: "Alarm")

Studio credits
Frenzal Rhomb : A Man's Not a Camel (assistant engineer)
Long Beach Dub Allstars : Right Back (assistant engineer)
Dio : Magica (assistant engineer)
Long Beach Dub Allstars : Wonders of the World (engineer)
Cypress Hill : Stoned Raiders (background vocals)

Song use
"So What" (from Polyamorous) in Wassup Rockers (2006)
"Pick a Card" (from Street Knuckles) in Saved (2006)
"Telling You Now" (from Street Knuckles) in Win a Date with Tad Hamilton! (2004), DEBS (2004), Smallville, and Las Vegas''

Music videos
"Telling You Now", "Pick a Card", "So What"

References

External links

Living people
American women singers
Year of birth missing (living people)
21st-century American women